The 1883 Columbia football team was an American football team that represented Columbia University as an independent during the 1883 college football season. The team had no coach. W. N. Eldridge was the team captain.

Schedule

References

Columbia
Columbia Lions football seasons
Columbia football